The Lambda Literary Award for Lesbian Memoir/Biography is an annual literary award established in 1994, presented by the Lambda Literary Foundation, to a memoir, biography, autobiography, or works of creative nonfiction by or about lesbians. Works published posthumously and/or written with co-authors are eligible, but anthologies are not.

Recipients

References 

Lesbian Memoir
Awards established in 1994
English-language literary awards
Lists of LGBT-related award winners and nominees